Son of the Tree is a science fiction novella by American writer Jack Vance. It was first published in Thrilling Wonder Stories magazine, June 1951, and in book form as half of an Ace Double in 1964 together with The Houses of Iszm. The version that appears in the Ace Double is still less than novel length at about 31,000 words, but is essentially the same as the original magazine version. Son of the Tree was re-published as a stand-alone volume in 1974 by Mayflower.

Plot introduction
One of Vance's earliest efforts, and part science fiction, part espionage story, protagonist Joe Smith has to contend with the machinations of various alien societies in search of the Earthman who ran off with his girl.

Plot summary
Son of the Tree begins with the arrival of Joe Smith on the planet Kyril, so distant that Earth is but a myth. Kyril is dominated by a religious aristocracy called "Druids", who rule over the five billion commoner "Laity", and who control worship of the "Tree of Life", a huge tree with a trunk five miles in diameter and  twelve miles high. The Druids are xenophobic, and consider Joe to be a spy. For unknown reasons, he is befriended by Hableyat, a native of the world of Mangtse and self-admitted spy, who finds him a job as a chauffeur for Druid Princess Elfane.

After witnessing a murder committed by Princess Elfane's lover Manaolo, Joe Smith flees Kyril on the spaceship Belsaurion, bound for the world Ballenkarch, his original destination – only to find that his fellow passengers include Hableyat, Manaolo and Princess Elfane, and that he is caught up as a pawn in a complex three-way political plot between the opposing worlds. Surviving a couple of murder attempts and puzzling over the intentions of Hableyat and Princess Elfane, he arrives on Ballenkarch, where he finds to his surprise that the Earthman he was seeking has made himself ruling prince, with the woman he left behind on Earth as his princess. However, his biggest surprise is yet to come, when he discovers the horrific true nature of the so-called "Tree of Life".

Major themes
The theme of trees with special powers connected to a religious sect recurs in a number of Vance's works, including The Houses of Iszm (where trees are the center of a society, similar to Kyril), Maske: Thaery (where “Druids” tend trees with extreme devotion) and The Gray Prince (where a race of natives worship trees, which they climb to die). The theme of a religious orthodoxy dominating a society to its detriment is also in many of Vance's earlier works.

Sources

External links
 Jack Vance home page and archive
 

1951 short stories
Science fiction short stories
Short stories by Jack Vance
Works originally published in Wonder Stories
Ace Books books